Blood in the Face is a 1991 documentary film about white supremacy groups in North America. It was directed by Anne Bohlen, Kevin Rafferty and James Ridgeway. It features many interviews with various white supremacist leaders, and archival footage of others.

Production details
Blood in the Face was inspired by a nonfiction book of the same name by author James Ridgeway, who is also credited as one of the film's directors. This documentary was largely shot in Cohoctah Township, Michigan. It focuses on a gathering of neo-Nazis, racists, and conspiracy theorists who expect people of color to ignite a Racial Holy War in the U.S.

Filmmakers Anne Bohlen and Kevin Rafferty take an intentionally leisurely, conversational tack with supremacists who have assembled for lectures and workshops on everything from getting their message out via home videos to moving all like-minded "white Christians" to the Pacific Northwest, especially the Idaho Panhandle.

According to the audio commentary on the Roger & Me DVD, Academy Award-winning American filmmaker Michael Moore appears as an off-screen interviewer because he was originally contacted to arrange a meeting between the filmmakers and the supremacists since he had previously interviewed them for a magazine.  At the last minute, the filmmakers backed out of the interview and Moore stepped in to conduct it.  Moore is thanked in the end credits.

Michael Moore does appear on camera during one interview, and can be heard during another interview.

External links

1991 films
American documentary films
Films based on non-fiction books
American independent films
Films about neo-Nazism
Films about race and ethnicity
White supremacy in the United States
Documentary films about racism in the United States
Documentary films about Nazis
1991 documentary films
1991 independent films
1990s English-language films
1990s American films
English-language documentary films